Eric McGill (born 16 October 1987) is an Irish footballer who last played for Bray Wanderers in the League of Ireland.

 He made his professional debut for Shamrock Rovers as a late substitute in the FAI cup game against Castlebar Celtic. Eric signed for Drogheda United on 31 July 2009 .

References

Living people
1987 births
Association footballers from County Dublin
Republic of Ireland association footballers
Shamrock Rovers F.C. players
Drogheda United F.C. players
Bray Wanderers F.C. players
League of Ireland players
Crumlin United F.C. players
Association football midfielders